Mount Omurga in Olympos, Turkey, is located alongside the Olympos ruins. It has three peaks in a distinctive arrangement (Omurga means 'spine' in Turkish), the most significant of which is Çamoda Peak. Çamoda is more than 500 meters high.  There are several ruins adjacent to Omurga, including a Byzantine defense fortification on the north face of Çamoda.

Omurga
Landforms of Antalya Province